James E. Hagan (January 25, 1902 – November 1965) was an American businessman and politician who served in the Massachusetts House of Representatives and as the twenty first mayor of Somerville, Massachusetts.

Mayor of Somerville
In October 1933, Hagan defeated eleven other candidates to win Somerville's first non-partisan mayoral primary.

See also
 1927–1928 Massachusetts legislature
 1929–1930 Massachusetts legislature
 1931–1932 Massachusetts legislature
 1933–1934 Massachusetts legislature

Notes

1902 births
1965 deaths
Democratic Party members of the Massachusetts House of Representatives
Mayors of Somerville, Massachusetts
20th-century American politicians